Fergusson is a surname.  Notable people with the name include:

Adam Fergusson (disambiguation), multiple people
Alex Fergusson (disambiguation), multiple people
Bernard Fergusson (1911–1980), former British Army officer and Governor-General of New Zealand
Charles Fergusson (1865–1951), former British Army officer and Governor-General of New Zealand
Clan Fergusson, a Scottish clan
Francis Fergusson (1904–1986), American academic and critic
Frances D. Fergusson (born 1944), former president of Vassar College
George Fergusson (diplomat) (born 1955), British High Commissioner to New Zealand
Harvey Fergusson (1890–1971), American writer
Harvey B. Fergusson (1848–1915), former American Congressman
James Fergusson (disambiguation), multiple people
Jean Fergusson (1944–2019), British television and theatre actress
John Duncan Fergusson (1874–1961), Scottish artist
Muriel McQueen Fergusson (1899–1997), former Canadian Senator and Speaker of the Senate
Robert Fergusson (1750–1774), Scottish poet 
Rod Fergusson, Canadian video game producer
William Fergusson (1808–1877), Scottish surgeon

See also
 Ferguson (name)

Scottish surnames
English-language surnames
Surnames of Ulster-Scottish origin
Patronymic surnames
Surnames from given names